Rosemont (foaled 1932 in Virginia) was an American Thoroughbred racehorse best known for his win in the 1937 Santa Anita Handicap, when he defeated the popular horse Seabiscuit.  This race was featured in a scene in the motion picture Seabiscuit (2003).

Rosemont was bred by William du Pont, Jr.  Du Pont purchased his dam while in foal in a dispersal sale, and got Rosemont when she gave birth.  He was trained by Richard E. Handlen and raced under du Pont's Foxcatcher Farm stables.  Among his other wins, Rosemont defeated the Triple Crown winner Omaha in winning the 1935 Withers Stakes at Belmont Park before a crowd of 25,000.

Following his retirement from racing, Rosemont stood at stud at William duPont's Walnut Hall Farm near Boyce, Virginia, where he had been foaled in 1932. Of his progeny, the most notable are Bed O' Roses, a U.S. Racing Hall of Fame inductee, and Berlo, the 1960 American Champion Three-Year-Old Filly.

References

External links
Rosemont's pedigree and partial racing statistics

1932 racehorse births
Racehorses bred in Virginia
Racehorses trained in the United States
Du Pont racehorses
Thoroughbred family 4-m